South Riding is a BBC serial in three parts from 2011, based on the 1936 novel South Riding by Winifred Holtby. It is directed by Diarmuid Lawrence and written by Andrew Davies. It stars Anna Maxwell Martin, David Morrissey, Peter Firth, Douglas Henshall, Penelope Wilton and John Henshaw.

The first episode aired on BBC One 20 February 2011, the two remaining on the following Sundays. In the United States, it aired on the PBS anthology series Masterpiece in May 2011.

Cast
 Anna Maxwell Martin as Sarah Burton
 David Morrissey as Robert Carne
 Peter Firth as Alderman Snaith
 Douglas Henshall as Joe Astell
 Penelope Wilton as Mrs. Beddows
 John Henshaw as Alfred Huggins
 Shaun Dooley as Mr. Holly
 Jennifer Hennessy as Mrs. Holly
 Janine Mellor as Bessy Warbuckle
 Charlie May Clark as Lydia Holly
 Katherine McGolpin as Midge Carne
 Lydia Wilson as Muriel Carne
 Daniel West as Young Robert Carne
 Ian Bartholomew as Gaius Drew
 Bríd Brennan as Miss Sigglesthwaite
 John-Paul Hurley as Reg Aythorne
 Penny Layden as Mrs Huggins
 Marie Critchley as Mrs Brimsley

References

External links
 
 
 Filming the 2011 BBC version railway sequences – includes links to video interviews with cast and crew members, and details of locations

2011 British television series debuts
2011 British television series endings
2010s British drama television series
BBC high definition shows
BBC television dramas
Television shows written by Andrew Davies
Television shows based on British novels
2010s British television miniseries
Television series set in the 1930s
Television shows set in Yorkshire
English-language television shows